Rachida Lamrabet (born 1970) is a Moroccan-born Belgian writer and lawyer writing in Dutch.

A native of the Rif region, she came to Belgium with her parents in 1972. Lamrabet until recently worked as a lawyer for the Centre for Equal Opportunities and Opposition to Racism. Her first novel Vrouwland (Woman Country), published in 2007, received the Flemish . In 2006, her story "‘Mercedes 207" was awarded the Kleur de kunst! New Voices from Flanders.

Her writing has appeared in Banipal, a magazine dedicated to contemporary Arab literature.

Criticism 

When she made the film 'debourkanisation' in March 2017  and signed several anti-Israel petitions she received a lot of criticism as this was not considered compliant with her function in the centre. Even her old manager Johan Leman went public on both issues. Ultimately this led to her dismissal: the Centre decided to distanciate publicly from her statements and fired her begin April 2017.

Selected works 
 Vrouwland (2007, Meulenhoff-Manteau)
 Een kind van God (Children of God), short stories (2008), received the  sponsored by the Bank Nederlandse Gemeenten
 De man die niet begraven wilde worden, novel (2011)
 De handen van Fatma, play (2014)

References 

1970 births
Living people
Belgian women novelists
Belgian women short story writers
Belgian short story writers
20th-century Belgian dramatists and playwrights
21st-century Belgian dramatists and playwrights
Belgian women dramatists and playwrights
Flemish women writers
Place of birth missing (living people)
21st-century Belgian novelists
21st-century short story writers
21st-century Belgian women writers
20th-century Belgian lawyers
21st-century Belgian lawyers
Belgian women lawyers